The  refers to the unsolved murders of the Miyazawa family in the 3-home Kamisoshigaya neighborhood of Setagaya, Tokyo, Japan, on the night of 30 to 31 December 2000.

Mikio Miyazawa, his wife Yasuko, their daughter Niina, along with their son Rei, were murdered during a home invasion by an unknown assailant who then remained in the family's house for several hours before disappearing. Japanese police launched a massive investigation that uncovered the killer's DNA and many specific clues about their identity, but the perpetrator has never been identified.

The media frenzy and long investigation of the murders became a cause célèbre to abolish the statute of limitations for crimes that could merit the death penalty in Japan, which was removed in 2010.

Murders 
At 10:40 a.m., on 31 December 2000, the bodies of 44-year-old Mikio Miyazawa, his 41-year-old wife Yasuko, and their children, eight-year-old Niina and six-year-old Rei, were discovered by Yasuko's mother, Haruko, at their house in the Kamisoshigaya neighborhood of Setagaya, in the western suburbs of Tokyo. Mikio, Yasuko, and Niina had been stabbed to death while Rei had been strangled.

Investigation of the crime scene by the Tokyo Metropolitan Police Department (TMPD) concluded that the family had been murdered on December30 to 31 at around 11:30p.m. to 12:05a.m. midnight JST, after which the killer stayed in the house for several hours. Takeshi Tsuchida, the chief of Seijo police station, was designated as the person in charge of the investigation at the time until his retirement.

The killer entered through the open window of the second-floor bathroom at the rear of the house, located immediately adjacent to Soshigaya Park, and gained access by climbing up a tree and then removing the window screen. The killer used his bare hands to strangle Rei, sleeping in his room on the second floor, killing him through asphyxiation. Mikio rushed up the first floor stairs after he detected the disturbance in Rei's room, fighting and injuring the killer until being stabbed in the head with a sashimi bōchō knife. A police report claimed that part of the sashimi knife's blade broke off inside Mikio's head, and the killer then attacked Yasuko and Niina with the broken knife until using a Santoku knife from the house to murder them.

The killer remained inside the house for 2 to 10 hours, using the family computer, consuming four bottles of barley tea, melon, and four ice creams from their refrigerator, using their toilet and leaving his feces in it without flushing, treating his injuries using first aid kits and other sanitary products, and taking a nap on a sofa in the second-floor living room. Drawers and papers were ransacked (with some being dumped in the bath and toilet) and some money was taken (although more was left behind). Surprisingly, the killer also left ten items behind on the family sofa (knife, muffler, hip bag, sweater, jacket, hat, gloves, shoes, and two handkerchiefs).

An analysis of Mikio Miyazawa's computer revealed that it had connected to the internet the morning after the murders at 1:18a.m. and again at around 10a.m., around the time Yasuko's mother Haruko entered the house and discovered the murders. Haruko became suspicious after being unable to call her daughter (the killer had unplugged the phone line) and visited the house but received no answer after ringing the doorbell. Authorities believe the killer had stayed in the house until at least 1:18a.m. but the computer usage at 10a.m. could have also been triggered by Haruko accidentally moving the mouse during her discovery of the crime scene.

Investigation 
Police have been able to deduce several very specific clues to the perpetrator's identity, but have been unable to produce or apprehend a suspect. It was determined that the killer had eaten string beans and sesame seeds the previous day after analyzing feces from the killer in the Miyazawas' bathroom. They determined that the clothes and sashimi knife left behind by the killer had been purchased in Kanagawa Prefecture.

Police also learned that only 130 units of the killer's sweater were made and sold, but they have only been able to track down twelve of the people who bought the sweaters. Trace amounts of sand were also found inside the hip bag that the perpetrator left at the scene, which after analysis was determined to come from the Nevada desert, more precisely the area of Edwards Air Force Base in California.

Suspect 
Investigators found the killer's DNA and fingerprints throughout the house, but none matched their databases, indicating that they do not have a criminal record. Physically, the killer is believed to be around 170 centimeters tall and of thin build. The police estimate the killer was born between 1965 and 1985 (15 to 35 years old at the time of the incident) due to the physicality required for entering the Miyazawa house and committing the murders. The Miyazawas' wounds indicate that the killer is likely to be right-handed.

The killer's blood was gained during an analysis of the murder scene that revealed traces of Type A blood, which would not have belonged to the Miyazawa family. A DNA analysis of the Type A blood determined the killer is male and possibly mixed race, with maternal DNA indicating a mother of European descent, possibly from a South European country near the Mediterranean or Adriatic Sea, and paternal DNA indicating a father of East Asian descent.

It is considered possible that the European maternal DNA comes from a distant ancestor from the mother's line rather than a fully European mother. Analysis of the Y-chromosome showed the Haplogroup O-M122, a common haplogroup distributed in East Asian peoples, appearing in 1 in 4 or 5 Koreans, 1 in 10 Chinese, and 1 in 13 Japanese. These results led to TMPD to seek assistance through the International Criminal Police Organization as the killer may not be Japanese or present in Japan.

Legacy
The investigation into the murders is among the largest in Japanese history, involving over 246,044 investigators who have collected over 12,545 pieces of evidence. All evidence related to the case remains in custody. As of December 2021, there is still a ¥20 million reward for information leading to the arrest of the killer.

In 2015, it was reported that forty officers were assigned to the case full-time. In 2019, it was reported that 35 officers are still assigned to the case. Every year, the TMPD makes a pilgrimage to the house for memorial ceremonies. Takeshi Tsuchida, the chief of Seijo Police Station, was designated as the person in charge of the investigation at the time until his retirement.

In 2015, An Irie, older sister of Yasuko Miyazawa, filed a complaint to the Broadcast and Human Rights and Other Related Rights Committee of the Broadcasting Ethics & Program Improvement Organization after she claimed that the TV Asahi documentary aired in 2014 misrepresented her after a TV Asahi reporter and ex-FBI agent used profiling to back a theory that the killer murdered the Miyazawas out of resentment.

In 2019, the TMPD announced that the Miyazawa house will be torn down because of its age and risk of collapsing with the interior already showing signs of deterioration. The move was appealed by the family and supporters.

See also
List of unsolved murders (2000–present)

References

External links 

 Tokyo Metropolitan Police Department investigation website, including pictures of the suspect's clothing. 
Police information (English) PDF

2000 murders in Japan
December 2000 events in Japan
Family murders
Setagaya
Unsolved mass murders
Unsolved murders in Japan